14568 Zanotta, minor planet
 Zanotta (company), Italian company